Gustaw Potworowski, count, (3 June 1800, Bielewo – 23 November 1860, Poznań) was a Polish activist, founder of the Kasyno in Gostyń, activist of the Polish League (Liga Polska).

Born into an old Calvinist noble family, was one of the leading persons of the Polish national movement in the Prussian Province of Posen. He was the founding chairman of the Polish National Committee (1848).

References
 Witold Jakóbczyk, Przetrwać na Wartą 1815–1914, Dzieje narodu i państwa polskiego, vol. III-55, Krajowa Agencja Wydawnicza, Warszawa 1989

Members of the Prussian House of Representatives
Members of the Sejm (Provinziallandtag) of Posen
1800 births
1860 deaths
People from Kościan County
People from the Grand Duchy of Posen
November Uprising participants
Member of the Prussian National Assembly